The 2019–20 TFF First League was the 19th season since the league was established in 2001 and 57th season of the second-level football league of Turkey since its establishment in 1963–64. The season began on 16 August 2019 and the regular season will be ended on 2 May 2020. Fixtures for the 2019–20 season were announced on 18 July 2019. On 12 March 2020, The Ministry of Youth and Sports announced matches will be played behind closed doors in the stadiums until the end of April due to the coronavirus pandemic. On 19 March 2020, the league was suspended. The league resumed behind closed doors on 19 June until 19 July 2020. The semi-finals were played on 22 and 26 July, then the final was played on 30 July 2020.

Teams
Akhisarspor, BB Erzurumspor and Bursaspor relegated from 2018–19 Süper Lig.
Denizlispor, Gençlerbirliği and Gazişehir Gaziantep promoted to 2019–20 Süper Lig.
Afjet Afyonspor, Elazığspor and Kardemir Karabükspor relegated to 2019–20 TFF Second League.
Keçiörengücü, Menemenspor and Fatih Karagümrük promoted from 2018–19 TFF Second League.

Stadiums and locations

League table

Positions by round
The table lists the positions of teams after each week of matches. In order to preserve chronological evolvements, any postponed matches are not included to the round at which they were originally scheduled, but added to the full round they were played immediately afterwards.

Results

Promotion Playoffs

Semifinals

|}

Final

|}

Statistics

Top goalscorers

References

External links 
  Turkish Football Federation PTT 1. League

Turkey
TFF First League seasons
2019–20 in Turkish football
TFF First League, 2019-20